Marcus Aemilius Lepidus Porcina was a consul of the Roman Republic in 137 BC.

In 125 BC Lepidus was an augur (a divinatory priest). In that year he was prosecuted by the censors. According to Velleius Paterculus, he was prosecuted by both censors, Gnaeus Servilius Caepio and Lucius Cassius Longinus Ravilla, for extravagance in the rent of his house. He hired a house for a yearly rent of 6,000 asses.  According to Valerius Maximus, he was prosecuted by Lucius Cassius and punished with a fine by a court of the people for building too high a holiday home in the region of Alsium.

Command in Hispania Citerior 
Lepidus was sent to Hispania Citerior during his consulship to replace his colleague Gaius Hostilius Mancinus, who was recalled to Rome and put on trial because he made a peace treaty with the Celtiberians during the Numantine War (153-133), which was rejected by the senate. Lepidus did not wait for instructions from Rome and, according to Appian, tired of idleness and seeking glory, he resolved to make war upon the Vaccaei, who were not at war with Rome, under the pretence of their having assisted Numantia. He persuaded Decimus Junius Brutus, the governor of Hispania Ulterior and his brother-in-law, to join him. They ravaged the countryside and besieged Pallantia, the largest city of the Vaccaei. Lepidus and Brutus were reached by Cinna and Caecilius, two messengers from Rome "who said that the senate was at a loss to know why, after so many disasters had befallen on them in Spain, should he be seeking a new war." They warned him not to attack the Vaccaei. Lepidus sent the messengers back to Rome and wrote that it was too dangerous to abandon this war. Lepidus took advantage of the senate's ignorance of the situation and Brutus' involvement to continue his operations.

Lepidus and Brutus begun to build siege machines and gather provisions. The siege was protracted and the Roman food supply failed. There was hunger and many soldiers and all the animals died. The two commanders persisted, but eventually had to give up. The Romans withdrew in a disorderly manner. They left everything behind, even the sick and wounded. The Vaccaei attacked their flanks and rear all day killing many Romans. This happened during Lepidus' proconsulship in 136 and, when the news reached Rome, Lepidus was stripped of his command and consulship. He got away with just a fine.

Oratory
Lepidus was a man of education and refined taste. Cicero, who had read his speeches, spoke of him as the greatest orator of his age and says that he was the first who introduced in Latin oratory the smooth and even flow of words which distinguished Greeks. He helped to form the style of Tiberius Gracchus and Gaius Carbo, who were accustomed to listen to him with great care. Cicero mentioned Lepidus and his relatives among the Roman orators who "were little, if at all, inferior to the Greeks." He was, however, very deficient in a knowledge of law and Roman institutions.

Politics
In politics Lepidus seems to have belonged to the optimates, a conservative political faction which supported the interests of the aristocracy. During his consulship he supported the opposition by Marcus Antius Briso (a plebeian tribune) against a bill on the introduction of voting by secret ballot in the Plebeian Council (Lex Cassia Tabellaria) proposed by another plebeian tribune, Lucius Cassius Longinus Ravilla. This bill would free the plebeian voters from electoral pressure. However, on the advice of Scipio Aemilianus Africanus, Brisio dropped his opposition and the bill was carried. It appears from a fragment of Priscian, that Lepidus spoke in favour of a repeal of the lex Aemilia, which was probably the sumptuary law proposed by the consul Marcus Aemilius Scaurus in 115.

References

2nd-century BC Roman augurs
2nd-century BC Roman consuls
Porcina, Marcus